Dactylagnus mundus, the giant sand stargazer, is a species of sand stargazer found in the Gulf of California and along the Pacific coast of North America from Baja California to Panama as well as around the Galapagos Islands. It can reach a maximum length of  SL. This species is of minor importance to local commercial fisheries.

References

External links
 Photograph

mundus
Fish described in 1863